The Tandya Mahabrahmana (or the Praudha Brahmana) ("great" Brahmana), also known as the Panchavimsha Brahmana from its consisting of twenty-five prapathakas (chapters)
is a Brahmana of the Samaveda, belonging to both of its Kauthuma and Ranayaniya shakhas. It deals with the duties of the udgātṛs generally, and especially of the various kinds of chants.

Contents
The work is divided into 25 prapathakas, which are further divided into 347 khandas (sections). An overview of the contents of the text is as follows:
 Prapathaka I: Collection of Yajus
 Prapathaka II-III: Vistutis
 Prapathaka IV–IX.2: Various rites (Jyotishtoma, Ukthya, Atiratra, Prakrtis of ekahas and ahinas)
 Prapathaka IX.3–IX.10: Somaprayaschittas
 Prapathaka X–XV: Dvadashaha rite
 Prapathaka XVI–XIX: One day rites
 Prapathaka XX–XXII: Ahina rites
 Prapathaka XXIII–XXV: Longer rites (known as the Satras)

External links
GRETIL etext

Brahmanas